In computability and complexity theory, ALL is the class of all decision problems.

Relations to other classes
ALL contains all of the complex classes of decision problems, including RE and co-RE.

External links
 

Complexity classes